Carntyne Stadium was a multi-sports stadium situated in the Carntyne area of Glasgow, Scotland, used mainly for greyhound racing and speedway.

Origins and opening
The Carntyne Greyhound Racecourse was situated between the Parkhead and Carntyne areas of Glasgow and opened for greyhound racing on 17 September 1927. The stadium ran along the railway track sandwiched between the railway and Myreside Street and was built on the site of a former running and trotting track. There were entrances on Myreside Street and at the far end of Duke Street just before the railway bridge and on the east side was a large wheel and axle works.

Greyhound Racing

History

The Scottish Greyhound Racing Company Ltd led by Jack Nixon Browne (later Lord Craigton) constructed the new stadium and became a National Greyhound Racing Society (NGRS) affiliated track. An odd shaped speedway track was built inside the greyhound circuit and greyhound racing took place five nights a week, Monday, Tuesday, Wednesday, Friday and Saturday at 7.45pm with a 6d entrance fee for the main enclosure. There was an M.S Cable
outside hare and a Union totalisator.

Within a year of opening the Scottish Greyhound Derby was inaugurated and the first greyhound to lift the crown was the Powderhall Stadium trained Glinger Bank. In 1927 the St Mungo Cup was added to the tracks major competitions. Ballycurreen Soldier trained by Patrick McKinney became a local superstar after a series of victories including the All England Cup in 1939, the Scottish Derby for trainer H Irving in 1940, the Scottish Derby in 1942 when trained by Michael Conroy and two more St Mungo Cup wins. After the war the track was valued by the owners at £3,700 but the taxman valuation set the figure of £4,500.

A casino was added in 1962 along with a new grandstand bar before the Greyhound Racing Association property trust claimed ownership of the track with the intentions of selling the site for redevelopment and lucrative returns. With little warning Carntyne ceased trading during the month of May 1972.

Competitions
Scottish Greyhound Derby
St Mungo Cup

Speedway

Stadium Manager Jack Nixon Browne (later an MP who went to the House of Lords as Lord Craigton) staged two dirt track speedway meetings in 1928. A new promotion built a new track in 1930 and four meetings were staged in ten days before it closed.

Stock Cars
On 24 June 1966 Spedeworth Scotland introduced Stock Car racing to the venue using a tarmac oval circuit. The final was for the West of Scotland Championship with Tiger Thomson the victor.

Football
Scottish Junior football club Bridgeton Waverley F.C. played their matches at the stadium for two years from 1960 after leaving their New Barrowfield ground (about one mile to the south), until disbanding in 1962.

Closure
The site was sold and knocked down in 1972 but no redevelopment took place; all that remained for 40 years was the small brick Duke Street entrance with the badly faded words 'Carntyne' above. This was not saved for heritage purposes and was cleared following the cleanup for the 2014 Commonwealth Games.  A modern housing development, Eastfields, now occupies the site.

Track records

References

Defunct greyhound racing venues in the United Kingdom
Sports venues in Glasgow
Sports venues completed in 1927
Sports venues demolished in 1972
Defunct speedway venues in Scotland
Stock car racing venues
1927 establishments in Scotland
Greyhound racing in Scotland
Demolished buildings and structures in Scotland
Demolished sports venues in the United Kingdom
1972 disestablishments in Scotland
Football venues in Glasgow